Ingolf Rød (2 October 1889 – 19 December 1963) was a Norwegian sailor who competed in the 1920 Summer Olympics.  He was a crew member of the Norwegian boat Jo, which won the gold medal in the 6 metre class (1919 rating).

References

External links 
 
 

1889 births
1963 deaths
Norwegian male sailors (sport)
Olympic sailors of Norway
Olympic gold medalists for Norway
Olympic medalists in sailing
Medalists at the 1920 Summer Olympics
Sailors at the 1920 Summer Olympics – 6 Metre